Ralph McKee was an American football coach. He was the first head football coach at Carthage College in Carthage, Illinois, serving  for six seasons, from 1895 to 1900, and compiling a record of 19–6–1.

Head coaching record

References

                                 

Year of birth missing
Year of death missing
Carthage Firebirds football coaches